Christian Rudolph is a retired East German athlete who specialized in the 400 metres hurdles.

Christian Rudolph may refer to:

 Christian Rudolph (billiards player), German professional billiards player

See also
Christian Rudolph Wilhelm Wiedemann, German physician